The Maritime Expeditionary Security Force (MESF) is a force within the United States Navy under the organizational structure of the Navy Expeditionary Combat Command. The MESF originated from the Naval Coastal Warfare community which transitioned to the MESF in the early 2000s. The MESF's primary mission is force protection with deployed operations occurring around the world. Anti-terrorism and force protection missions include harbor and maritime infrastructure defense, coastal surveillance, and special missions. Specialized units work together with MESF squadron staffs providing intelligence and communications. MESF units deploy worldwide to detect, deter, and defend an area or unit. Recent locations include the United States, Panama, Korea, Saudi Arabia, Kuwait, Iraq, Afghanistan, Bahrain, United Arab Emirates, and Egypt.

MESF Sailor ratings range from Master-at-Arms, Boatswain's Mates, to supporting rates of Engineman, Hospital Corpsmen, to Information Technology Specialists. Units receive extensive training in small boat operations, combat medical and first responder care, small arms, crew-served weapons, and close quarters battle.

Two Maritime Expeditionary Security Groups in San Diego, California and Virginia Beach, Virginia provide centralized planning, control, training, coordination, equipping, and integration of deployable units trained to operate in high density, multi-threat environments. Units conduct force protection of strategic shipping and naval vessels operating in the inshore and coastal regions, anchorages and harbors, from bare beach to sophisticated port facilities. Members of this community are highly encouraged to earn their Expeditionary Warfare Specialist Designation.

Effective 9/17/2020, all Coastal Riverine Forces changed their name to “Maritime Expeditionary Security Forces”

Organization

The MESF consists of two groups; one in San Diego and one in Virginia Beach. This includes two expeditionary security detachments in Guam and Bahrain; seven Maritime Expeditionary Security Squadrons, and thirty-one Maritime Expeditionary Security Companies

Maritime Expeditionary Security Group One (MESG 1), homeported in San Diego, California.

Maritime Expeditionary Security  Squadron One  (MSRON 1)-- Naval Air Station North Island
Maritime Expeditionary Security  Squadron 11  (MSRON 11)-- Naval Weapons Station Seal Beach
Maritime Expeditionary Security  Squadron Three (MSRON 3) -- Naval Outlying Landing Field Imperial Beach
Maritime Expeditionary Security Force Group One, Detachment Guam (MESF-1 DET Guam) in Naval Base Guam.

Maritime Expeditionary Security Group Two (MESG 2), homeported Joint Expeditionary Base Little Creek-Fort Story (JEBLC-FS) in Virginia Beach, Virginia.
Maritime Expeditionary Security Squadron Two (MSRON-2) -- (Joint Expeditionary Base Little Creek-Fort Story)
Maritime Expeditionary Security Squadron 4 (MSRON 4) -- (Joint Expeditionary Base Little Creek-Ft Story)
Maritime Expeditionary Security Group Two, Detachment Bahrain (MESG 2 DET Bahrain)-- Naval Support Activity Bahrain

Reserve Squadrons:
Maritime Expeditionary Security Squadron Eight (MSRON 8) -- Naval Station Newport Rhode Island
Maritime Expeditionary Security Squadron Ten (MSRON 10) -- Naval Air Station Jacksonville

See also 
 Naval Coastal Warfare
 Enlisted Expeditionary Warfare Specialist
 Mobile Inshore Undersea Warfare Unit
 Expeditionary war

References

External links 
 Navy Expeditionary Combat Command 
 Naval Coastal Warfare Squadron FIVE
 

Military units and formations of the United States Navy
Riverine warfare